James Gadderar (1655–1733) was a clergyman of the Scottish Episcopal Church. Previously a minister at Kilmaurs, he was consecrated a college bishop on 24 February 1712 by Bishop George Hickes (i.e. a bishop without a diocese.) In November 1721 he traveled to Aberdeen and acted as Bishop Archibald Campbell's vicar-depute. Gadderar supported the practice of primitive 'usages' in the diocese, which brought him into a dispute with the College of Bishops at Edinburgh. After the resignation of Bishop Archibald Campbell in 1725, he was made Bishop of Aberdeen, remaining there until his death.

References

1655 births
1733 deaths
Bishops of Aberdeen
College bishops